Highway 6 (Kvish Shesh), also known as the Trans-Israel Highway or Cross-Israel Highway (Kvish Ḥotzeh Yisra'el), is a major electronic toll highway in Israel. Highway 6 is the first Israeli Build-Operate-Transfer road constructed, carried out mainly by the private sector in return for a concession to collect tolls on the highway for a given number of years. It is also one of the largest infrastructure projects undertaken in Israel.

History
The highway is officially dedicated the Yitzhak Rabin Highway (Kvish Yitzḥak Rabin), though this name is not commonly used. It began operating in 2002 and continues to be lengthened as construction proceeds on newer sections. The southern terminus is at Shoket Interchange, opened in November 2016. The northern terminus is the Tel Kashish Interchange, opened on November 14, 2018, where the highway now merges into Highway 70 heading northwest. Another northern extension to Somech Interchange opened in 2019.

Goals
The aim of the Highway is to provide an efficient north–south transportation corridor in the country while allowing drivers to bypass the traffic-congested Tel Aviv region, located in the center of the country. Thus it is the easternmost major highway in Israel, in some places located almost right on the Green Line. Currently the highway is 204 km long, all of which is a controlled-access highway. This figure will grow in the next few years as additional segments are extended both northward and southward from the existing section of the road.  some segments were under construction while others were undergoing statutory approvals and permitting processes.

Characteristics and pricing
Highway 6 uses a system of cameras and transponders to toll vehicles automatically. There are no toll booths, allowing it to operate as a normal freeway with interchanges. A radio antenna detects when a vehicle with a transponder has entered and exited the highway, calculating the toll rate. For vehicles without a transponder, an automatic license plate recognition system is used. Monthly statements are mailed to users. Highway 6 is based on the technology of the Highway 407 in Ontario, Canada developed by Raytheon.

The pricing scheme is based on the number of segments a driver passes in a given trip. Each segment is the road span between two interchanges. , the pricing for up to 3 segments was 19.78 NIS, 23.83 NIS for 4 segments, and 27.88 NIS for 5 or more segments. An additional fee is paid when driving through the "northern" segment, the cost of which is additional 5.74 NIS. Pricing for motorcycles and heavy vehicles such as trucks is different.

The price above is discounted for drivers who register with Highway 6's operator and install the in-vehicle transponder unit (called a "Passkal", lit. "easy-pass") to record their highway usage. When a vehicle does not have a transponder, its license plate is scanned and the vehicle identified. Drivers who pre-register their license plate with the operator and establish a direct billing relationship also receive a discounted rate (though they pay more than those who have installed a "Passkal"). If a license plate is not located in Highway 6's database, the bill is sent to the owner of the vehicle according to the car registration with the Israeli Ministry of Transportation. Such a vehicle pays the highest rate.

The licensed road operator, Derech Eretz, operates a fleet of service vehicles that patrol the entire length of the highway and assist drivers in need. Since it is technically a private road, the road operator is required to pay the Israel police for traffic enforcement.

The tolled sections north of Yokneam are operated by a different franchisee called "6 – Northern Crossing".  Registration and billing for these sections are handled separately by them and tolling is performed using automatic license plate recognition only (no tolling by transponder).

Free segments

All the existing (and planned) segments of Highway 6 south of Soreq interchange are free in both directions, as is the segment between Ben Shemen and Daniyyel interchanges, where Highway 6 runs concurrently with Highway 1. Also free is the northern section between Highway 77 and Highway 75 in the western Jezreel Valley (in part of the section where Highway 6 runs concurrently with Highway 70).

Financial statistics
In March 2006, Derech Eretz reported a profit of 89 million NIS for 2005, an increase of 56% from 2004, on income of 779 million NIS, an increase of 137% from 2004.

At the end of 2005:
 about 500,000 registered subscribers (one subscriber can own multiple vehicles),
 1.36 million individual users (increase from 1.1 million users),
 21 million trips,
 80% of trips are by subscribers,
 Bill collection success rate was 97%.

Interchanges

The highway's kilometer count starts at 30, since it includes the planned southern extensions.

References

External links
Official website of "Derech Eretz Highways Management Corporation Ltd" (road operator) 
Official website of "Trans-Israel Highway Corporation Ltd" (planning and construction) 
Driving on Highway 6 Video journey on YouTube
Official website of 6 Northern Crossing (in Hebrew)

Build–operate–transfer
6
6
Toll roads
Public–private partnership projects